Ernie Krivda (born February 6, 1945, in Cleveland, Ohio as Krvda Ernö) is a jazz saxophone player.

Ernie Krivda began his professional career in 1963 with the Jimmy Dorsey Orchestra. During the 1960s he played in bands of two Cleveland legends, organist Eddie Baccus and guitarist Bill DeArango. Later, in the early 1970s, he became the leader of the house band of the Smiling Dog Saloon. There he shared the stage with Chick Corea, Elvin Jones, Herbie Hancock and many others. Alto saxophonist Cannonball Adderley heard Krivda and recommended him to Quincy Jones. After touring and recording with Jones, Krivda moved to New York and signed a contract with Inner City Records. A series of albums received great critical acclaim.

Krivda has since recorded numerous additional albums, eighteen in all, and has appeared at such prestigious venues as The Kool Jazz Festival, The North Sea Jazz Festival and at Carnegie Hall. In the 1990s, Krivda made recordings for Cadence, Koch International and C.I.M.P. Records. It was during this time that he founded The Fat Tuesday Big Band in Northeast Ohio. He continued to tour including concerts in Los Angeles, Chicago and New York City.

He remains active in education as artistic director of The Cuyahoga Community College Jazz Studies Program in Cleveland, Ohio and touring clinician for The Yamaha Instrument Company. Among his gigs was a tribute to Stan Getz at Cleveland's Severance Hall, home of The Cleveland Orchestra at which Krivda played Eddie Sauter's FOCUS. It was the first performance of this piece since Stan Getz played it in 1961.

Krivda has been the recipient of many Cleveland awards including the Free Times Readers Poll for Best Jazz Act, Best Swing Big Band and Best Horn Player. He has also won The Editors Choice of ClevelandSearch.com, as The city's Best Instrumentalist. He continues to be the subject of articles in national publications, such as Down Beat and Jazz Times Magazine, and his work is documented in The Encyclopedia of Jazz and many Jazz Record Guides.

References

External links
Official web site

American jazz saxophonists
American male saxophonists
Musicians from Cleveland
1945 births
Living people
CIMP artists
21st-century American saxophonists
Jazz musicians from Ohio
21st-century American male musicians
American male jazz musicians